The 2017 South Australian National Football League season (officially the SANFL Macca's League) was the 138th season of the South Australian National Football League (SANFL) Australian rules football competition.

The season commenced on 7 April and concluded with the Grand Final on 24 September. Sturt won their second consecutive premiership and 15th overall, defeating Port Adelaide by 1 point in the Grand Final.

Premiership Season

Round 1

Round 2

Round 3

Round 4

Round 5

Round 6

Round 7

Round 8

Round 9

Round 10

Round 11

Round 12

Round 13

Round 14

Round 15

Round 16

Round 17

Round 18

Ladder

Finals series

Qualifying and Elimination Finals

Semi-finals

Preliminary final

Grand Final

Awards and premiers

Awards
 The Magarey Medal (awarded to the best and fairest player in the home and away season) was won by Mitch Grigg of Norwood, who polled 23 votes.
 The Ken Farmer Medal (awarded to the leading goalkicker in the home and away season) was won by Brett Eddy of Port Adelaide. He kicked 53 goals in the 2017 home and away season.
 The Stanley H. Lewis Memorial Trophy was won by Woodville-West Torrens, with 2325 points, which was 125 points ahead of second-place . It was the Eagles' 6th trophy having previously won in 1993, 2000, 2013, 2015 and 2016.
 The R.O. Shearman Medal (awarded to the player adjudged best by the 10 SANFL club coaches each game) was won by Joel Cross of South Adelaide.
 Woodville-West Torrens were the league minor premiers, finishing top of the ladder at the end of the home and away season with 14 wins and 4 losses. It is the club's 7th minor premiership in the SANFL and their 3rd in succession.

Premiers
  were the League premiers, defeating Port Adelaide by 1 point.
  were the Reserves premiers, defeating West Adelaide by 15 points.
  were the Under 18 premiers, defeating  by 43 points.

References

South Australian National Football League seasons
SANFL